Aatish is a Pakistani serial created by Momina Duraid. The drama, written by Shagufta Bhatti, aired on HUM TV on 20 August 2018 till 4 March 2019 and starred Azfar Rehman and Hina Altaf Khan.

Summary
The story begins with an orphan girl named Asma, abandoned by her mother, a maid. The mother has left her to protect Asma from being sold by her alcoholic father. and asks her employer to raise Asma. The employer agrees and raises Asma. Asma enjoys doing all the work in the house rather than studying. She is considered a maid even though Asma considers herself a family member.

A family from the United States visits the house when seeking to arrange for their eldest son to be engaged. They also arrive with the younger son, Shehryar who treats Asma as a servant and in a degrading manner. The household wants Asma to marry the house driver so that she can remain as a maid. Asma is deeply hurt to know that after all these years, the family still thinks of her as a maid rather than part of the family. Later Shehryar falls in love with Asma and they get secretly married. Shehryar's mother, Noureen disapproves of Asma and tries to degrade her, but is unaware of the marriage. Shehryar returns to America to complete Asma's paperwork where he is injured and falls into a coma. Asma is bereft and makes dua for him. Later, Asma is ill and Anna Bi, the household help takes her to a doctor and discovers Asma is pregnant. Asma becomes depressed. Anna Bi persuades Asma to reveal the father's name. Asma tells her that the father is Shehryar which anger Anna Bi. Later, Anna Bi visits Asma, sympathizes with her, asks her for proof of the pregnancy, and Asma shows her test results. Nazia then destroys the test results and plans to send Asma away from the house. Nazia asks Anna Bi for help and tells her to lie to Asma, saying that her mother is alive and wants to see her before she dies. Eventually, Asma tells everyone that she is pregnant but will not reveal the father's identity which angers them. Asma then has a car accident with a couple who take her to the hospital and then allow Asma to stay at their house. Shehryar, who has returned, becomes friends with the husband of the couple not knowing that Asma is living in their house. Shehryar then sees the husband help Asma which makes him think that she has betrayed him. Asma is deeply hurt by her husband and vows revenge. She manages to tell Shehryar what happened to her which he already knew when he finds out by Anna bi. Nazia adopts her super havoc form and fights Asma. Then Shehryar agrees to marry Sumbul, but finds Asma, hugs her and then refuses to marry Sumbul. Sumbul is not upset because she didn't want to marry him anyway. Asma and Shehryar live happily ever after.

Cast
 Azfar Rehman as Sheheryar
 Hina Altaf as Asma
 Azra Mamsoor
 Bigul Hussain
 Saba Hameed as Noureen, Shehryar's mother
 Akeel Abbas as Saad, Noureen's brother
 Madiha Rizvi as Nazia; Saad's wife
 Anam Goher as Sumbul, Nazia's sister
 Faisal Rehman as Sameer
 Shermeen Ali as Zara, Sameer's wife
 Jahanara Hai as Sameer's mother

Reception
The drama received good ratings and competed with ARY's Balaa. Aatish's episodes have gotten millions of views on YouTube. It became instant hit, and gained high TRPs as 10.1 and 12.6 TRPs at its highest.

Nominations

Soundtrack 
The title song was sung by Ali Tariq & Bushra. The music was composed by Hassan Munir and the lyrics written by Sabir Zafar.

References

External links
 Aatish on Hum.TV
 

Pakistani drama television series
2018 Pakistani television series debuts
2019 Pakistani television series endings
Urdu-language television shows
Hum TV original programming
Hum TV
Pakistani romance television series